The Neve Sha'anan Street bombing was a double suicide bombing attack which occurred on 17 July 2002 in the Neve Sha'anan street in Tel Aviv, near the Old Tel Aviv Central Bus Station. 5 people were killed in the attack and approximately 40 people were injured. Islamic Jihad claimed responsibility for the attack.

The attack
On Wednesday evening, 17 July 2002 at 10:10 pm, two Palestinian suicide bombers, wearing explosive belts containing about 33 pounds of explosives, blew themselves up, only 20 meters apart, at the Neve Sha'anan street in Tel Aviv, near the Old Tel Aviv Central Bus Station. The explosives hidden on the bodies of the suicide bombers contained a large quantity of shrapnel and nails, to maximize the amount of injuries. Three people were killed there immediately from the force of the blasts and 40 people were injured. Two additional people died of their injuries a few days after the attack.

The perpetrators
The Palestinian Islamist militant organization Islamic Jihad claimed responsibility for the double attack.

Official reactions
Involved parties
:
 Spokesman for Prime Minister Ariel Sharon, whom spoke about the incident stated that "The Palestinian Authority continues to do nothing to stop the murderous attacks launched from its territory".

:
Palestinian National Authority – PNA officials denounced the bombing attack as it "condemns operations targeting civilians, whether they are Palestinians or Israelis."

 Supranational
 –  U.N. Secretary-General Kofi Annan condemned the incident and urged both sides not to let the violence derail peace efforts.

 International
 – White House spokesman Scott McClellan spoke about the incident and stated that "This is a despicable act of terrorism which we strongly condemn."

References

External links
 Attack Kills at Least Five in Tel Aviv – published on Fox News on 18 July 2002
 Double suicide attack rocks Tel Aviv – published on BBC News on 18 July 2002

Mass murder in 2002
Suicide bombings in 2002
Suicide bombing in the Israeli–Palestinian conflict
Terrorist incidents in Israel in 2002
Terrorist attacks attributed to Palestinian militant groups
Terrorist incidents in Tel Aviv
2000s crimes in Tel Aviv
July 2002 events in Asia
Attacks on bus stations
2002 murders in Israel
Building bombings in Israel
Islamic terrorism in Israel